Lajos Börzsönyi (1916 – 30 April 1984) was a Hungarian sports shooter. He competed in two events at the 1948 Summer Olympics.

References

1916 births
1984 deaths
Hungarian male sport shooters
Olympic shooters of Hungary
Shooters at the 1948 Summer Olympics
Sport shooters from Budapest
20th-century Hungarian people